Richard Lee Cartwright (1925–2010) was an American philosopher of language and emeritus professor of philosophy at MIT.

Education and career
Cartwright took his B.A. from Oberlin College in 1945, and his Ph.D. from Brown University in 1954 under Curt John Ducasse and Roderick Chisholm. He taught at the University of Michigan and then at Wayne State University. In 1967 he moved to MIT, where he was appointed to strengthen the new graduate philosophy program, and where he continued to teach until his retirement in 1996. Cartwright served twice as head of philosophy at MIT, and also as head of the humanities department. He was the doctoral advisor of 12 doctoral students at MIT, including Richard Boyd.

References

20th-century American philosophers
Analytic philosophers
Philosophy academics
1925 births
2010 deaths

Oberlin College alumni
Brown University alumni
University of Michigan faculty